Next Caller is an unaired American television comedy series that was scheduled to premiere mid-season on NBC as part of the 2012–13 television schedule. The network placed a series order in May 2012. Season one was set to feature seven half-hour episodes.

On October 12, 2012, NBC announced the cancellation of the series after only four episodes had been filmed, citing creative differences with star Dane Cook, and that the filmed episodes would not be aired. It became the second series of the 2012–13 television season to be canceled, after Made in Jersey.

Premise
A very unlikely pair of satellite radio disc jockeys are forced to share the microphone for a relationship call-in show in New York City. Cam (Dane Cook) is crude, egotistical, and unwilling to share the spotlight, while Stella (Collette Wolfe) is a perky feminist who has just moved over from NPR.

Cast
Dane Cook as Cam Dunne
Collette Wolfe as Stella Hoobler
Jeffrey Tambor as Jefferson Mingus
Joy Osmanski as Winnie Hyde
Wolé Parks as Keith Calhoun
Desmin Borges as Derek
Trey Gerrald as Kent
Chris Perfetti as Cody the Intern
 Tia Shipman as Angry Bob

Episodes

See also
 List of television series canceled before airing an episode

References

External links

Unaired television shows